Daniela Reimer (born 26 September 1982 in Potsdam) is a German rower.

References

External links
 
 

1982 births
Living people
German female rowers
Sportspeople from Potsdam
Olympic rowers of Germany
Rowers at the 2004 Summer Olympics
Olympic silver medalists for Germany
Olympic medalists in rowing
Medalists at the 2004 Summer Olympics
World Rowing Championships medalists for Germany